The 2012 Louisiana–Lafayette Ragin' Cajuns football program represented the University of Louisiana at Lafayette in the 2012 NCAA Division I FBS football season. They were led by second-year head coach Mark Hudspeth and played their home games at Cajun Field. They were a member of the Sun Belt Conference. However, in 2015 Louisiana–Lafayette vacated four wins due to major NCAA violations.

Preseason

Award watchlists

Sun Belt Media Day

Predicted standings

Preseason All–Conference Team

Offense
RB Alonzo Harris
WR Javone Lawson
OL Leonardo Bates

Defense
DB Melvin White

Specialists
PK Brett Baer

Roster

Schedule

Source: Schedule

Game summaries

Lamar

@ Troy

@ Oklahoma State

FIU

Tulane

@ North Texas

Arkansas State

@ Louisiana–Monroe

@ Florida

Western Kentucky

South Alabama

@ Florida Atlantic

East Carolina–New Orleans Bowl

References

Louisiana-Lafayette
Louisiana Ragin' Cajuns football seasons
New Orleans Bowl champion seasons
Louisiana-Lafayette Ragin' Cajuns football